IMDEA is a project founded by the Madrid Regional Government, included in the IV Regional Plan of Scientific Research and Technological Innovation 2005-2008 (PRICIT), for the purpose of setting up advanced research centers and higher education and training in the Community of Madrid. Between 2006 and 2008 the project created nine IMDEA Institutes of which two (Mathematics and Social Sciences) were closed.

Organization 
Each of the IMDEA Institutes is managed by an independent foundation. There are currently seven, each specializing in an area of knowledge, as indicated by their names:

 IMDEA Water Institute combines knowledge from experimental, legal and social sciences as well as engineering, to address a variety of water management concerns in the 21st century. Its research includes scientific and social aspects of water, including supply and demand; quality and quantity; physical, chemical and biological characteristics; time and space variability; watershed processes; and economic, ecological, and equity considerations.
 IMDEA Food Institute was initially set up to undertake research in food-related areas, such as nutrition and health, or food quality and safety. By agreement from the Scientific Council, it has increasingly focused research on Nutritional Genomics.
 IMDEA Energy Institute was created to promote and undertake research and development in energy-related areas, principally renewable energy and clean energy technologies, with the aim of developing a sustainable energy system with little or no environmental impact.
 IMDEA Materials Institute brings together researchers from around the world to Madrid to conduct research in Materials Science and Engineering. The institute also focuses on technology transfer to the industrial sector in order to increase business competitiveness.
 IMDEA Nanoscience Institute, created jointly by the Community of Madrid and the Spanish Ministry of Education and Science, organizes research groups of scientists, both local and international, to advance Nanoscience and Nanotechnology. The Institute also provides scientific and technical training, and promotes technology transfer and the creation of businesses in Madrid and Spain.
 IMDEA Networks Institute's researchers study the emergent properties of today's communication networks in order to be able to improve the algorithms and protocols that allow these networks to operate. They create mathematical models and validate theories through simulations and measurements in test beds and/or real-world deployments.
 IMDEA Software Institute devises rigorous methods that allow cost-effective development of practical software products with high-quality, sophisticated functionality, i.e., safe, reliable, and efficient. The focus of the Institute includes all phases of the software development cycle (analysis, design, implementation, validation and verification), as well as methods, languages, and tools.

Each of the Institutes is governed and administered by a Board of Trustees, who may be appointed or elected, and who choose a Director. Some of the trustees are well-known scientists, and others are experts in areas related to the foundations' goals, working at universities and other research centers on the Board.  Trustees with business experience or recognized professional prestige in the sectors related to the foundations' goals may also be appointed.

Each institute also has a Scientific Council, or Scientific Advisory Board, composed of researchers in the areas related to each Institute's goals. These scientists advise the Director in the development of the annual action plan and the four-year plan of objectives; evaluating the results of both of these plans; advising the Council on all scientific work submitted for its approval; and making proposals to the Council for the renewal and appointment of trustees.

Closures 

 IMDEA Mathematics, directed by Enrique Zuazua was closed the first.
 IMDEA Social sciences started its closure in Jan 2012, after its subsidies were withheld.

Controversies 
 In 2014, COLT TECHNOLOGIES SERVICES SAU denounces IMDEA Materials Institute for fraud in using the communication system, asking for a compensation of 149.487,5 euros.
 In Feb, 2016 the Camara de cuentas de Madrid publishes how IMDEA Water Institute created fictitious contracts.
 In April 2016, the European Union stops the payments on the IMDEA Energy Institute building for "severe deficiences in the management and tracking".
 In April 2017, the current Scientific Director and founder of IMDEA Materials Institute explains in an interview how he proselytizes in the Institute, and how researchers are instructed against divorce and abortion.
 IMDEA institutes promise tenure positions to their workers when promoted to senior researchers, but only offers 'contrato de investigador distinguido', a Spanish position that is not equivalent to the Anglo-Saxon term 'tenure' and allows the easy firing of employees. Also, according to a report and documents shown by El Confidencial. IMDEA Materials proactively includes a clause in the so-called 'tenured' researchers to allow annual evaluation that leads to their firing when not passed.
 According to a report and documents shown by El Diario, IMDEA Materials requested more than 36000  euros to the European Union for a non existing work in a project that was justified by including a researcher that confessed not having performed any essential contribution.

References

External links 
 IMDEA Water Institute
 IMDEA Food Institute
 IMDEA Energy Institute
 IMDEA Materials Institute
 IMDEA Nanoscience Institute
 IMDEA Networks Institute
 IMDEA Software Institute
 Report of the Madrid Institutes for Advances Studies (IMDEA)

Research institutes in the Community of Madrid
Science and technology in Spain
Non-profit organisations based in Spain